Mireșu may refer to several places in Romania:

Mireșu Mare, a commune in Maramureș County
Mireșu Mare and Mireșu Mic, villages in Sângeru Commune, Prahova County